The following list sorts sovereign states and dependent territories and by the total number of deaths. Figures are from the 2022 revision of the United Nations World Population Prospects report, for the calendar year 2021.

List of countries by number of deaths 

Countries and dependent territories by the number of deaths in 2021 according to the World Population Prospects 2022 of the United Nations Department of Economic and Social Affairs. The list takes account of the impact of the global COVID-19 pandemic on mortality.

See also 

 List of sovereign states and dependent territories by death rate
 List of countries by life expectancy
 List of countries by number of births

References

External links 

 United Nations, Department of Economic and Social Affairs – Population Division – World Population Prospects, the 2022 Revision

Deaths
Deaths
Demographic economics
Human geography
Death